Turin is a town in Lewis County, New York, United States. The population was 761 at the 2010 census. Turin has a village, also named Turin. The town is south of Lowville, the county seat, and north of Rome.

History 

The town was first settled circa 1797.

The town of Turin was established in 1800 from the town of Mexico (Oswego County). In 1803, part of Turin was used to create the town of Martinsburg. Another part of Turin was added to Martinsburg in 1819. The town of West Turin formed from another part of Turin in 1830.

Geography
According to the United States Census Bureau, the town has a total area of 31.4 square miles (81.3 km2), of which 31.2 square miles (80.8 km2) is land and 0.2 square mile (0.5 km2) (0.67%) is water.

The eastern town line is defined by the Black River. Part of the town is on the Tug Hill Plateau.

New York State Route 12 and New York State Route 26 are north-south highways that parallel the Black River through the town. NY-12 is closer to the river.

Demographics

As of the census of 2000, there were 793 people, 296 households, and 227 families residing in the town.  The population density was 25.4 people per square mile (9.8/km2).  There were 417 housing units at an average density of 13.4 per square mile (5.2/km2).  The racial makeup of the town was 99.37% White, 0.13% Black or African American, 0.13% Native American, 0.13% Asian, and 0.25% from two or more races. Hispanic or Latino of any race were 0.13% of the population.

There were 296 households, out of which 35.1% had children under the age of 18 living with them, 59.8% were married couples living together, 11.5% had a female householder with no husband present, and 23.0% were non-families. 19.9% of all households were made up of individuals, and 8.8% had someone living alone who was 65 years of age or older.  The average household size was 2.68 and the average family size was 3.06.

In the town, the population was spread out, with 28.5% under the age of 18, 6.8% from 18 to 24, 24.6% from 25 to 44, 24.7% from 45 to 64, and 15.4% who were 65 years of age or older.  The median age was 40 years. For every 100 females, there were 98.7 males.  For every 100 females age 18 and over, there were 100.4 males.

The median income for a household in the town was $37,500, and the median income for a family was $41,364. Males had a median income of $27,000 versus $22,321 for females. The per capita income for the town was $15,930.  About 8.6% of families and 10.5% of the population were below the poverty line, including 14.2% of those under age 18 and 11.1% of those age 65 or over.

Communities and locations in the town of Turin 
Burdicks Crossing – A former location on the Black River.
Glenfield – A hamlet near the Black River at the town line in the northeastern part of the town.
Gomer Hill – An elevation in the western part of Turin.
House Creek – An eastward-flowing tributary of the Black River.
Houseville – A hamlet on NY-26, north of Turin village. The community is named after its founder, Eleazer House.
Snow Ridge Ski Area – A skiing area north of Turin village.
Turin – A village on NY-26 near the southern town line.
Welch Hill – A hamlet by the southern town line, west of Turin village.
Whetstone Gulf State Park – A state park at the northern town line, north of Houseville.

In popular culture 
The real-world geographic coordinates of Turin are found in an ancient temple beneath Rome, Italy in the "Da Vinci Disappearance" add-on mission for the Assassin's Creed: Brotherhood video game. It was discovered in the later game Assassin's Creed III that the coordinates marked the location of a Grand Temple hidden underground in Turin.

References

Towns in Lewis County, New York